José Alberto Aguilar e Iñárritu (born 11 April 1954) is a Mexican economist and politician affiliated with the Institutional Revolutionary Party. As of 2014 he served as Deputy of the LIX Legislature of the Mexican Congress as a plurinominal representative.

References

1954 births
Living people
People from La Paz, Baja California Sur
20th-century Mexican economists
Deputies of the LIX Legislature of Mexico
Institutional Revolutionary Party politicians
21st-century Mexican politicians
Politicians from Baja California Sur
National Autonomous University of Mexico alumni
Members of the Chamber of Deputies (Mexico) for Baja California Sur